Jashon Karlfred Sykes (born September 25, 1979) is a former American football linebacker. He played college football for the Colorado Buffaloes, and was subsequently signed by the Denver Broncos.  He started 11 games during his career with the Broncos.

After his playing career, Sykes became a recruiting and operations assistant with Colorado football in 2006. In 2007 and 2008, Sykes was on-campus recruiting director for Colorado and training camp assistant coach with the Broncos. From 2009 to 2010, Sykes was the assistant operations director and coordinator of football relations at Colorado. From 2011 to 2012, Sykes was director of football operations at Colorado. Beginning in 2013, Sykes was director of football operations at San Diego State.

References

Living people
1979 births
Colorado Buffaloes football players
Denver Broncos players
American football linebackers
Junípero Serra High School (Gardena, California) alumni
Players of American football from Los Angeles